Caleb Howard Baumes (March 31, 1863 Bethlehem, Albany County, New York – September 25, 1937 near Hudson, New York) was an American lawyer and politician from New York.

Life
He was born on March 31, 1863, in Bethlehem, New York.

He married in 1883 and had two sons.

He was a member of the New York State Assembly (Orange Co., 1st D.) in 1909, 1910, 1911, 1912 and 1913.

He was a member of the New York State Senate (27th D.) from 1919 to 1930, sitting in the 142nd, 143rd, 144th, 145th, 146th, 147th, 148th, 149th, 150th, 151st, 152nd and 153rd New York State Legislatures. He championed a 1926 law mandating life imprisonment for four-time felony offenders, the Baumes law.

At the New York state election, 1930, he ran on the Republican ticket for Lieutenant Governor of New York with Albert Ottinger but they were defeated by Democrats Franklin D. Roosevelt and Herbert H. Lehman. Afterwards he resumed the practice of law.

He died while riding on a train on September 25, 1937, near Hudson, New York when returning from an Odd Fellows convention in Milwaukee.

References

1863 births
1937 deaths
People from Orange County, New York
Republican Party members of the New York State Assembly
Republican Party New York (state) state senators
People from Bethlehem, New York